The 1976–77 season was the 21st season of the Liga Nacional de Baloncesto. Real Madrid won the title.

Teams and venues

Team Standings

Stats Leaders

Points

References

ACB.com 
Linguasport 
1976–77 Spanish Basketball Federation competition archive 

Liga Española de Baloncesto (1957–1983) seasons
 
Spanish